Czeklin  is a former village in the administrative district of Gmina Bobrowice, within Krosno Odrzańskie County, Lubusz Voivodeship, in western Poland.

References

Czeklin